Lomographa vestaliata, the white spring moth, is a moth in the family Geometridae. The species was first described by Achille Guenée in 1857. It is found in North America, where it has been recorded from Newfoundland west to south-eastern British Columbia and south to Florida and Texas. The habitat consists of xeric shrubby edges and woodlands.

The wingspan is 15–23 mm. Adults have shiny white translucent wings. Adults are diurnal and on wing in spring.

The larvae have been recorded feeding on Prunus, Crataegus, Sorbus, Malus, Physocarpus and Viburnum species.

References

Moths described in 1857
Lomographa
Moths of North America